Krzysztof Bodziony (born July 9, 1985 in Rybnik) is a Polish footballer who currently plays for MKS Kluczbork.

References

External links
 
 

1985 births
Living people
Polish footballers
Podbeskidzie Bielsko-Biała players
Flota Świnoujście players
Zagłębie Sosnowiec players
People from Rybnik
Sportspeople from Silesian Voivodeship
Association football midfielders
MKP Pogoń Siedlce players